Mr. Bond, referred to in court documents as Philip H., is a pseudonymous Austrian far-right activist, musical artist and rapper who published numerous anti-Semitic, homophobic, xenophobic, racist, and Neo-Nazi parody songs between April 2016 and 2019. He was arrested in January 2021 and sentenced to 10 years in prison in April 2022.

Music 
Mr. Bond mostly used popular hip-hop music, but also pop, punk and EDM music to create his parody songs. His music is mainly in English, but he also recorded three songs in German. At one time, it was available on Spotify, YouTube, and Apple Music.

Investigation and arrest 
In 2019, Mr. Bond's song Power Level was played on livestream by the Halle synagogue shooter, which drew attention to him. He had stated in one of his songs that he was from Austria. Mr. Bond was identified by Austrian investigators through PayPal.

Mr. Bond was arrested at his home in Paternion, Carinthia, Austria and has been held in detention at  since his arrest on January 20, 2021, for "producing and broadcasting Nazi ideas and incitement to hatred".

References 

Living people
Austrian activists
Antisemitism in Austria
Austrian fascists
Austrian parodists
Austrian neo-Nazis
Pan-European nationalism
Year of birth missing (living people)